Bridlington is a town and civil parish in the East Riding of Yorkshire, England. The town has two main centres; the old town with a priory and the coastal resort with a harbour.

It is on the Holderness part (Flamborough Head to the River Humber) of the Yorkshire Coast by the North Sea. The stream called Gypsey Race flows through the town and enters the North Sea at the harbour.

The Priory Church of St Mary and associated Bayle (or gate) are Grade I listed buildings on the site of an Augustinian Priory. As a sea-fishing port, the town is known for shellfish, and is the largest lobster port in Europe, with over 300 tonnes of the crustaceans landed there each year. It has been termed the "Lobster Capital of Europe". Alongside manufacturing, retail and service firms, its main trade is summer tourism. It holds one of the UK's coastal weather stations.

History

Archaeological evidence shows habitation in the Bronze Age and in Roman Britain. The settlement after the Norman conquest was called Bretlinton, later Berlington, Brellington and Britlington, before gaining its present name in the 19th century. The 1086 Domesday Book has Bretlinton. The several suggested origins all trace the name to the Anglo-Saxon custom of matching a personal name with a settlement type.

The date of earliest habitation at Bridlington is unknown, but the  man-made Danes Dyke at nearby Flamborough Head goes back to the Bronze Age. Some believe Bridlington was the site of a Roman station.

A Roman road from York, now Woldgate, can be traced across the Yorkshire Wolds into the town. Roman coins have been found: two hoards in the harbour area, along with two Greek coins from the second century BC — suggesting the port was in use long before the Roman conquest of Britain.

It has been suggested that a Roman maritime station, stood near the modern town. In the early second-century, Ptolemy described what was probably Bridlington Bay in his Geography as  "Gabrantwikone bay suitable for a harbour". No sheltered ancient harbour has been found, but coastal erosion will have destroyed traces of any Roman installation near the harbour.

In the fourth century AD, Count Theodosius set up signal stations on the North Yorkshire coast to warn of Saxon raids. Flamborough Head is also believed to have had one – probably on Beacon Hill, now a gravel quarry, from where Filey, Scarborough Castle and the Whitby promontory can be seen. A fort at Bridlington would have made a centre of operations for these. Another suggestion has been a line of signal stations stretching south round Bridlington Bay. This counterpart to the northern chain would have guarded a huge accessible anchorage from barbarian piracy.

Near Dukes Park are two bowl barrows known as Butt Hills, now designated ancient monuments in the National Heritage List for England of Historic England. Nearby are remains of an Anglo-Saxon cemetery on a farm outside Sewerby.

In the Second World War, Bridlington suffered several air raids that caused deaths and much bomb damage. The Royal Air Force had training schools in the town collectively known as RAF Bridlington, with one unit, No. 1104 Marine Craft Unit, continuing until 1980.

Manor
Domesday Book, with the earliest known reference to Bridlington, records that  headed the Hunthow Hundred held by Earl Morcar, which passed to William the Conqueror by forfeiture. It also records the effect of the Harrying of the North: the annual value of the land had fallen from £32 in the time of Edward the Confessor to eight shillings (£0.40) at the time of the survey, comprising two villeins and one socman with one and a half Carucate, the rest being waste.

The land was given to Gilbert de Gant, uncle of King Stephen, in 1072. It was inherited by his son Walter and thereafter appears to follow the normal descent of that family. After the Dissolution of the Monasteries, the manor remained with the Crown until 1624, when Charles I passed it to Sir John Ramsey, who had recently been created Earl of Holderness. In 1633, Sir George Ramsey sold the manor to 13 inhabitants of the town, on behalf of all the manor tenants. In May 1636, a deed was drawn up empowering the 13 men as Lords Feoffees or trust holders of the Manor of Bridlington.

Social and political
Walter de Gant founded an Augustinian priory on the land in 1133, confirmed by Henry I in a charter. Several succeeding kings confirmed and extended Walter de Gant's gift: King Stephen granted an additional right to have a port, King John in 1200 gave permission for a weekly market and an annual fair, and Henry VI allowed three annual fairs, on the Nativity of Mary and the Deposition and Translation of St John of Bridlington in 1446. In 1415 Henry V visited the Priory to give thanks for victory at the Battle of Agincourt.

The town began to grow in importance and size around the site of the dispersed priory. In 1643 Queen Henrietta Maria of France landed there with troops to support the Royalist cause in the English Civil War, before moving on to York, which became her headquarters.

Industrial

In 1837, an Act of Parliament enabled the wooden piers to be replaced with two stone piers to the north and south. Apart from landing fish, the port was used to transport corn: the 1826 Corn Exchange can still be seen in Market Place. There used to be mills in the town for grinding it, which led in turn to some breweries starting locally, but like most industry, these had petered out by the latter part of the 20th century.

Governance

Bridlington is within the unitary authority of the East Riding of Yorkshire. Its three wards are Bridlington North, Bridlington South and Bridlington Old Town and Central, returning eight councillors out of 67. The civil parish consists of the town of Bridlington and the villages of Bessingby and Sewerby. It is run by a town council of twelve councillors, of which the three wards each return four.

The Town Council coat of arms is described as: Per Sable and Argent three Gothic Capital letters B counterchanged on a Chief embattled of the second two Barrulets wavy Azure and for the Crest Issuant from a Coronet composed of eight Roses set upon a rim of a Sun rising Gules. with the motto:Signum Salutis Semper  meaning Always the bringer of good health.

Bridlington lies in the large East Yorkshire parliamentary constituency that covers the mostly rural, northern part of the county, including the towns of Driffield, Market Weighton and Pocklington. Its size and shape correspond to the East Yorkshire/North Wolds District under the earlier county of Humberside.

The town has been subject to several changes in parliamentary representation. From 1290 to 1831 it was part of the large Yorkshire constituency, sending two members until 1826, when it gained an additional two. Thereafter it was part of the East Riding of Yorkshire constituency until 1885, returning two members. Further reform reduced the boundaries again, to a single-member Buckrose seat until 1950. From 1950 to 1997, Bridlington had its own MP, until reform extended the boundary to include more countryside, as the single-seat East Yorkshire constituency.

Bridlington was designated a municipal borough in 1899. Local government reorganisation in 1974 included it in the new county of Humberside, which caused resentment among residents against being excluded from Yorkshire. The town became the administrative centre of a local government district, initially called the Borough of North Wolds but later changed to the Borough of East Yorkshire. The district disappeared when the county of Humberside was abolished in the 1990s, the new East Riding of Yorkshire unitary authority absorbing it and the neighbouring county districts, and Bridlington no longer having any formal local-government administrative status above town-council level.

Geography

The Gypsey Race river flows through the town, the last  being below ground from the Quay Road Car Park. The solid geology of the area is mainly from the Cretaceous period, consisting of Chalk overlain by Quaternary Boulder clay. The chalk is exposed as the land rises to the north of the town, where a cliff, probably formed in the last interglacial, extends inland at right angles to the present sea cliff, and forms the promontory of Flamborough Head.

Bridlington is in an area said to have the highest coastal erosion rate in Europe. Southwards the coast becomes low, but northwards it is steep and very fine, where the great spur of Flamborough Head projects eastwards. The sea front is guarded by a sea wall and a wide beach with wooden groynes to trap the sand. Offshore, the Smithic Sands sandbank stretches out into the bay, as an important habitat for many marine species. Bridlington north and south beaches have won EU environmental quality awards over the years.

Climate
The climate is temperate with warm summers and cool, wet winters.

Demography

2001 census
The 2001 UK census showed a population 47.4 per cent male and 52.6 per cent female. The religious affiliations were 77 per cent Christian, 0.14 per cent Buddhist, 0.03 per cent Jewish, 0.196 per cent Hindu, 0.04 per cent Sikh, 0.22 per cent other, and the rest, over 22 per cent stating no religion or not declaring one. The ethnic make-up was 98.7 per cent White, 0.43 per cent Mixed, 0.08 per cent Black/Black British, 0.19 per cent Chinese/Other Ethnic and 0.49 per cent Asian/British Asian. There were 16,237 dwellings.

2011 census
The 2011 UK census showed that a population split of 48.2 per cent male to 51.8 per cent female. The religious breakdown was 66.2 per cent Christian, 0.2 per cent Buddhist, 0.1 per cent Muslim, 0.1 per cent Hindu, 0.1 per cent Sikh, 0.0 per cent Other, and the remaining 33.3 per cent stating no religion or not declaring one. The ethnic make-up was 98.5 per cent White British, 0.7 per cent Mixed Ethnic, 0.2 per cent Black British, 0.5 per cent Chinese/Other Ethnic and 0.6 per cent British Asian. There were 17,827 dwellings.

Economy

From the early history of Bridlington, a small fishing port grew up near the coast, later known as Bridlington Quay. After the discovery of a chalybeate spring, the Quay developed in the 19th century into a seaside resort. Bridlington's first hotel was opened in 1805 and it soon became a popular resort with industrial workers from the West Riding of Yorkshire. A new railway station opened on 6 October 1846 between the Quay and the historic town. The area round it was developed and the two areas of the town were combined.

Bridlington's popularity declined along with the industrial parts of the north and the rising popularity of cheap foreign holidays. Although the fishing fleet also declined, the port remains popular with sea anglers for trips along the coast or further out to local shipwrecks. Bridlington has lucrative shellfish exports to France, Spain and Italy, said to be worth several million pounds a year.

Culture and community
Bridlington is served by the Bridlington Free Press and the East Riding Mail. BBC Radio Humberside and Viking FM are radio stations which broadcast to the town, and to the Hull and East Riding region. Bridlington gold and This is The Coast also broadcast to the town and up the coast as far north as Whitby.

Jake Thackray's song "The Hair of the Widow of Bridlington" mocks Bridlington for the ostensible small-mindedness of its inhabitants.

There are three main parks. Queen's Park is a small open area at the junction of the B1254 and Queensgate. Westgate Park is a mostly wooded area between Westgate and the A165 on the outskirts of the town. The largest open area is Duke's Park, between Queensgate and the railway line. It hosts Bridlington Sports and Community Club, a skate park and Bridlington Town Football Club. In addition, there is a Sports Centre on the outskirts, in Gypsey Road, with a general-purpose sports hall, a gymnasium and squash courts. In January 2014, Bridlington Leisure World on the Promenade, with its swimming facilities, gymnasium and indoor bowling rinks, closed for redevelopment. A temporary Olympic legacy pool was opened by Jo Jackson in January 2014 at the Bridlington Sports Centre in Gypsey Road, while Leisure World was rebuilt. The new centre opened on 23 May 2016, with an official opening on 1 July 2016 by Rebecca Adlington, Gail Emms and Dean Windass.

The town has a public library in King Street. Within the triangle of Station Avenue, Station Road and Quay Road are the Town Hall, Magistrates Court and several other government buildings. On South Marine Drive there is an RNLI Life Boat Station. There has been a life boat since 1805, manned wholly by volunteers. It received a new Shannon-class lifeboat in 2018, with some redevelopment to accommodate it.

Close to the A165/A614 junction is Bridlington Hospital and the Ambulance Station. On the opposite side, closer to the town centre, is the fire station, established in 1960, with a mix of full-time and on-call crew. There is a post office and depot not far from the level crossing in Quay Road.

Town crier

David Hinde, who lived in the nearby village of Bempton and was a member of the Ancient and Honourable Guild of Town Criers and the Loyal Company of Town Criers, was appointed in the Queen's Diamond Jubilee Year of 2012 by Bridlington Town Council. He was the first town crier in Bridlington since 1901. On 23 July 2013 Hinde gave a special proclamation outside Bridlington Priory, before a visit from Prince Charles and Camilla Parker-Bowles as part of the special "Priory 900" celebrations.

On 17 August 2013, at the town's Sewerby Park, Hinde's cry was recorded at 114.8 decibels. He appeared as the Walmington-on-Sea town crier in the 2016 film Dad's Army.

Landmarks

Bridlington Priory, also known as the Priory Church of St Mary, is a Grade I listed building named after the Augustinian Priory on which it was built. It was once fortified; the Bayle (gate) nearby is what remains of that fortification and also a Grade I listed building. It has a ring of eight bells (tenor c. 24 cwt, 05 t) with a long draft. It also has a large four-manual organ that boasts the widest "scaled" 32-foot reed (contra tuba) in the United Kingdom. Bridlington's war memorial is located in a triangular patch of garden at the junction of Prospect Street and Wellington Road. It was unveiled on 10 July 1921 by Captain S. H. Radcliffe, C. M. G., R. N.

Bridlington Cemetery in Sewerby Road dates from the 19th century and includes 73 Commonwealth War Graves. The Grade II listed Gothic cemetery chapels, gatehouse and lodge were built in 1869 by the architect Alfred Smith of Nottingham.

Bridlington Spa opened in 1896, when Bridlington in its heyday was a leading entertainment resort and a nationally famous dance venue, where many well-known entertainers appeared, including David Bowie and Morrissey. By 2005 the condition of the building had deteriorated to a point where East Riding of Yorkshire Council had to undertake a thorough refurbishment in 2006–2008. It has since begun to attract well-known names again: in 2013 indie rock bands the Kaiser Chiefs and Kasabian, Irish band The Script and Joe McElderry all performed there.

In 2014 blue plaques went up for Herman Darewski, composer and conductor of light music, and Wallace Hartley, leader of the orchestra playing as the Titanic sank. Hartley had led an orchestra in the town in 1902. Darewski was musical director for the town in 1924–1926 and 1933–1939.

Transport

Bridlington is served by a railway station on the Yorkshire Coast Line between Hull and Scarborough. It opened on 6 October 1846 between the Quay and the Old Town.

East Yorkshire Motor Services has a depot, running nine local and six out-of-town bus routes, including York, Scarborough, Driffield, Beverley and Hull. The company operates a summer Beachcomber open-top bus service in Bridlington. Yorkshire Coastliner runs a service to Filey, Malton, York, Tadcaster and Leeds.

The town lies at the junction of two trunk roads: the A165 between Hull and Scarborough and the A614 between Bridlington and Nottingham. The A614 was extended in 1996 to include the length previously known as the A166 to York.

Four land trains run in Bridlington: the Yorkshire Rose, Yorkshire Lass and Yorkshire Lad and the Spalight Express. Two run on the North Promenade between Leisure World and Sewerby Hall and Gardens linking Bridlington town centre with the summer car parks. One runs on the South Promenade linking Bridlington town centre to the park and ride and South Cliff Caravan Park. In the 1970s and 1980s there were two other trains — the Burlington Bertie and Bridlington Belle.

Education

Primary
Bridlington Civil Parish has seven primary schools, counting Burlington Infant and Junior together. All are mixed gender, for pupils between three or four and eleven years of age.

Bay Primary School in St Alban Road had 335 pupils in 2013. Burlington Infant School in Marton Road had 239. Burlington Junior School, also in Marton Road, had 320 pupils. Hilderthorpe Primary School in Shaftesbury Road had 328 pupils. Martongate Primary School in Martongate had 424 pupils. Quay Academy in Oxford Street had 390 pupils. Our Lady and Saint Peter RC Primary School, built in 1977 (formerly St Mary's R.C. Primary School) is located in George Street and had 210 pupils. New Pasture Lane Primary School in Burstall Hill had 177 pupils.

Secondary
Bridlington School is a mixed-gender specialist Sports and Design and Technology College for 11–18-year-olds. Located in Bessingby Road on the outskirts of the town, it had a 2013 capacity of 1,244 pupils. There have been many notable past pupils. Headlands School in Sewerby Road caters for mixed-gender eleven to 18-year-olds. It partners the town's other secondary school and had a 2013 capacity of 1,485 pupils.

Further and higher education
East Riding College provides tertiary education for students from 16. Located in St Mary's Walk, it is close to Bay Primary School. Courses cover both academic and vocational subjects.

Health service
All six GP practices closed their lists to new patients in 2016 due to problems with premises and staff shortages. The town has an elderly population, which adds to demand. In May 2018 they were obliged by NHS England to reopen their lists, but there was no funding for a proposed Health and Wellbeing Centre, which was to have housed five surgeries.  In October 2022 it was announced that three of the five practices would be closed because of challenges recruiting and retaining staff. Two larger practices, Humber Primary Care and Practice Three will take over and each serve around 19,000 patients.

Religious sites

The main Anglican place of worship is the Priory Church of St Mary in Church Green. Christ Church in Quay Road, next to the war memorial, was built in 1841 by Gilbert Scott. Originally a chapel of ease, it became a parish church in 1871 and is now a Grade II listed building. Emmanuel Church in Cardigan Road is a modern red-brick building, also part of the Church of England.

The Harbourside Evangelical Church stands in a side road off Bridge Street. The Kingdom Hall of Jehovah's Witnesses is in Station Avenue. The Cornerstone Church, once known as The Chapel Hall, is an Evangelical Church in St John's Walk. There has been a Baptist church in the town since 1698, the current place of worship being on the corner of Quay Road and Portland Place. On the corner of St John Street and Brett Street is the Free Presbyterian Church. The independent Evangelical Church in Ferndale Terrace is called Calvary Chapel by the Sea.

The strong Methodist Church presence in the town since 1770 is covered in various locations. St John's Burlington Methodist Church in St John's Street remains. The chapel in the Promenade lasted from 1852 until 1957 as part of the United Methodist Free Church. The Primitive Methodists established a chapel in St John Street in 1833, but moved to a nearby location in 1849. This in turn was rebuilt in 1877 and lasted until 1970. The Primitive Methodists also had a chapel known as the Central Methodist Church on the Quay in 1833. It moved to Chapel Street in 1870 and built itself larger premises there in 1878. In 1969 it joined with the Chapel Street Methodist Church, which was in existence in 1810 in what was originally Back Street. This was rebuilt in 1873 and lasted until 1999, when it became the final Methodist congregation to unite with the present church.

The Roman Catholic Church of Our Lady and St Peter stands in Victoria Road. The Catholics had long lacked a permanent mission in the town. A previous 1886 building in Wellington Road had not provided sufficient space when a mission was eventually granted. Modern premises were built in 1893–1894 by Arthur Lowther. The church hall adjacent was added in 1963. The connection to the sea is evident on the dedication to Our Lady, also known as the Star of the Sea, and to St Peter, Patron Saint of Fishermen. The convent in the High Street is associated with the church and though now run by the Sisters of Mercy, was originally Dominican.

Sport
The town has a semi-professional Bridlington Town A.F.C., founded in 1918, refounded in 1994, and now playing in the Northern Counties East League Premier Division (NCEL). Its home ground is a stadium in Queensgate. The team's honours include the FA Vase in 1993, three NCEL Premier Division titles and 15 East Riding Senior Cup's. The town also has a junior football club, Bridlington Rangers, with teams playing in various age groups of the Hull Boys Sunday Football League. Bridlington Sports Club plays in the Humber Premier League.

In cricket, the top team of Bridlington Cricket Club plays in the York and District Senior League Division 1. It also runs three Saturday league teams and junior teams.

Bridlington Rugby Union Football Club plays next to Bridlington Town A.F.C. at Dukes Park. It fields two senior men's teams, a women's team and numerous junior sections. The Men's 1st XI played in Yorkshire 1 for the 2019 season, after spending three years in North East 1. It also reached the final of the RFU National Intermediate Cup at Twickenham on 4 May 2013, where it lost 22–30 to Brighton Blues.

Bridlington Hockey Club has existed for over a century. It currently plays home matches at Bridlington Astro Centre in Bessingby Road. It also fields two ladies' sides and a junior development section for girls and boys. An annual hockey festival is held, with both men's and women's tournaments. A new format added to the festival for 2014 gave chances for men and women to play together.

Other sports played around Bridlington include tennis, pétanque, fencing and archery.

Bridlington hosted the first Tour de Yorkshire in 2015, the start of the second stage in 2017, and of the third stage in 2019.

Notable people

Natives
William of Newburgh, a 12th-century English chronicler and historian, was born in Bridlington.
William Kent (1686–1748), architect, landscape architect and furniture designer, was born in the town.
Sir John Major, 1st Baronet of Worthlingworth Hall was born in Bridlington in 1698. The merchant and member of Parliament died in 1781.
Benjamin Fawcett, a woodblock colour printer and ornithologist, was born in the town in 1808.
Henry Freeman was a Whitby fisherman and lifeboatman born in the town.
A. E. Matthews, stage and film actor, was born in Bridlington in 1869. He featured in the 1956 version of Around the World in 80 days, Doctor at Large and Carry On Admiral.
Thomas Fenby, a Liberal politician and blacksmith, was born in the town in 1875. He acted as Mayor of Bridlington and represented the town as MP. He died at his Bridlington home in 1956.
Cecil Burton (1887–1971), cricketer and former Yorkshire County Cricket Club captain, was born in the town, as was his younger brother Claude Burton (1891–1971), who also played for Yorkshire.
Francis Johnson CBE (1911–1995), born in Bridlington, was a renowned church architect.
Gordon Lakes, former Deputy Director General of the Prison Service, was born in the town in 1928. He is credited with helping to achieve improved working conditions among UK prisons.
Bob Wallis (1934–1991), jazz musician, was born in Bridlington. He had some success in the British charts in the late 1950s and early 60s. His father was harbourmaster in the town.
David Pinkney, businessman and auto racing driver competing in the British Touring Car Championships, was born in the town on 5 July 1952.
Andrew Dismore, the Labour politician and lawyer was born in the town on 2 September 1954. He was educated at Bridlington School.
Mark Herman, film director and screenwriter, was born in the town in 1954. Among his best-known works are Brassed Off, Little Voice and The Boy in the Striped Pyjamas.
Angela Eagle and her twin sister Maria Eagle, both Labour politicians, were born in the town on 17 February 1961.
Craig Short, professional footballer and manager, born in Bridlington on 25 June 1968, has played at top levels in both the English and Turkish league systems, including Derby County, Everton, and Blackburn.
Richard Cresswell, professional football player, was born in Bridlington on 20 September 1977. He started with York City F.C., before playing in higher divisions of the league system.
Adam Khan, racing driver, was born in the town on 24 May 1985.
Charlie Heaton, actor and musician, is known for playing Jonathan Byers in the Netflix supernatural drama series Stranger Things.
Stephen W. Parsons, musician, composer, songwriter and music producer
Rosie Jones, comedian and writer

Residents
John Twenge (St John of Bridlington), a 14th-century English saint, was a Canon of Bridlington Priory.
David Hockney used to own a house in Bridlington, at which an assistant drank a cleaning product and died in March 2013.

Twin towns – sister cities
 Bad Salzuflen, Germany
 Millau, France
The town's entrance sign shows the twin town names to motorists.

See also
Burlington, Ontario was named after Bridlington by John Graves Simcoe.
Burlington, New Jersey was named after Bridlington.
Burlington County, New Jersey was named after Bridlington.

References

 
Seaside resorts in England
Beaches of the East Riding of Yorkshire
Towns in the East Riding of Yorkshire
Civil parishes in the East Riding of Yorkshire
Populated coastal places in the East Riding of Yorkshire
Fishing communities in England
Ports and harbours of Yorkshire